Jalen is both a surname and given name. Notable people with the name include:

Given name

A
Jalen Adams (born 1995), American basketball player
Jalen Adaway (born 1998), American basketball player

B
Jalen Beeks (born 1993), American baseball player
Jalen Billups (born 1992), American basketball player
Jalen Bridges (born 2001), American basketball player
Jalen Brown (born 1995), American soccer player
Jalen Brunson (born 1996), American basketball player

C
Jalen Camp (born 1998), American football player
Jalen Cannon (born 1993), American basketball player
Jalen Carter (born 2001), American football player
Jalen Catalon (born 2001), American football player
Jalen Chatfield (born 1996), American ice hockey player
Jalen Collins (born 1993), American football player
Jalen Crisler (born 1994), American soccer player
Jalen Crutcher (born 1999), American basketball player

D
Jalen Dalton (born 1997), American football player
Jalen Davis (born 1996), American football player
Jalen Duren (born 2003), American basketball player

E
Jalen Elliott (born 1998), American football player

G
Jalen Green (born 2002), American basketball player
Jalen Guyton (born 1997), American football player

H
Jalen Harris (born 1998), American basketball player
Jalen Hawkins (born 2001), American soccer player
Jalen Henry (born 1996), American basketball player
Jalen Hood-Schifino (born 2003), American basketball player
Jalen Hudson (born 1996), American basketball player
Jalen Hurd (born 1995), American football player
Jalen Hurts (born 1998), American football player

J
Jalen Jelks (born 1997), American football player
Jalen Johnson (born 2001), American basketball player
Jalen Jones (born 1993), American basketball player
Jalen Jones (footballer) (born 1998), English footballer

L
Jalen Lecque (born 2000), American basketball player

M
Jalen Markey (born 1995), American soccer player
Jalen Mayfield (born 2000), American football player
Jalen McDaniels (born 1998), American basketball player
Jalen McMillan (born 2001), American football player
Jalen Mills (born 1994), American football player
Jalen Milroe (born 2002), American football player
Jalen Moore (disambiguation), multiple people
Jalen Morton (born 1997), American football player
Jalen Myrick (born 1995), American football player

N
Jalen Nailor (born 1999), American football player
Jalen Neal (born 2003), American soccer player

P
Jalen Parmele (born 1985), American football player
Jalen Philpot (born 2000), Canadian football player
Jalen Pickett (born 1999), American basketball player
Jalen Pitre (born 1999), American football player
Jalen Pokorn (born 1979), Slovenian footballer

R
Jalen Ramsey (born 1994), American football player
Jalen Reagor (born 1999), American football player
Jalen Reeves-Maybin (born 1995), American football player
Jalen Reynolds (born 1992), American basketball player
Jalen Richard (born 1993), American football player
Jalen Riley (born 1993), American basketball player
Jalen Robinson (born 1994), American soccer player
Jalen Rose (born 1973), American basketball player and sportscaster

S
Jalen Saunders (born 1992), American football player
Jalen Schlachter (born 1992), American football player
Jalen Seegars (born 1998), American basketball player
Jalen Smith (born 2000), American basketball player
Jalen Suggs (born 2001), American basketball player

T
Jalen Tabor (born 1995), American football player
Jalen Tate (born 1998), American basketball player
Jalen Thompson (born 1998), American football player
Jalen Tolbert (born 1999), American football player
Jalen Tolliver (born 1995), American football player

V
Jalen Virgil (born 1998), American football player

W
Jalen Wilkerson (born 1995), American football player
Jalen Williams (born 2001), American basketball player
Jalen Wilson (born 2000), American basketball player
Jalen Wydermyer (born 2000), American football player

Surname
Janez Jalen (1891–1966), Slovene writer and priest

See also
Jalon (disambiguation), a disambiguation page for "Jalon"
Jaylen, a page for people with the given name "Jaylen"